Fox Trap is a 2016 British horror film directed by Jamie Weston.

Plot
Years after an accident that leaves a young teenage girl disabled, the group of friends who were responsible meet at a remote manor in the countryside for a class reunion where they are targeted by a masked killer hellbent on revenge.

Cast
 Becky Fletcher as Frankie Hollingsway 
 Klariza Clayton as Emma 
 Alex Sawyer as Niall
 Kate Greer as Connie
 Therica Wilson-Read as Anna
 Julia Eringer as Dina
 Carey Thring as Ray
 Richard Summers-Calvert as Josh
 Tara MacGowran as Miss Johnson
 Georgina Dugdale as Lorraine Mayfield
 Shelley Lankovits as Jess
 Charlene Cooper as Ali
 Tony Manders as Inspector Davies

References

External links

English films
British slasher films
British horror films
2016 horror films
2016 films
British independent films
2010s English-language films
2010s British films